The Lorraine-Hanriot LH.30 was a training monoplanes built in France in the early 1930s.

Design
It was a conventional parasol-wing monoplane with fixed tailskid undercarriage, the main units of which were mounted on outriggers attached to the wing struts. The pilot and instructor sat in tandem open cockpits. The LH.30 was of wood and metal construction.

Specifications (LH.30)

References

1930s French civil trainer aircraft
L.030
Parasol-wing aircraft
Aircraft first flown in 1931